Middle-Age Spread is a 1977 play written by New Zealand playwright Roger Hall that premiered at the Circa Theatre in Wellington, New Zealand. The play was later staged at the London West End Lyric Theatre in 1978, winning the Laurence Olivier Award Comedy of the Year.

Film adaptation

The play was adapted by Keith Aberdein, released in 16 mm film format in 1979, directed by John Reid, with Grant Tilly, Donna Akersten, Dorothy McKegg, and Bridget Armstrong.

References

Further reading

External links
 

1977 plays
Comedy plays
Laurence Olivier Award-winning plays
Plays by Roger Hall
West End plays
New Zealand plays
New Zealand plays adapted into films